Hoplophyllum is a genus of flowering plants in the family Asteraceae. It has two species, Hoplophyllum spinosum and Hoplophyllum ferox, both native to South Africa.

Both species are shrubs. The leaves are hard and spine-tipped, much longer than wide, and either cylindrical or somewhat flattened. They are grooved with stripes running lengthwise.  The type species is Hoplophyllum spinosum.

Hoplophyllum is derived from two Greek words, hoplon "a tool or weapon" and phyllon "a leaf", a reference to the spiny leaves.

The name Hoplophyllum was originated in 1836 by A.P. de Candolle  when he assigned Hoplophyllum spinosum to this genus in his classic work Prodromus Systematis Naturalis Regni Vegetabilis. This species had originally been named Pteronia spinosa by Linnaeus filius in 1782 in his book Supplementum Plantarum.

The closest relative of Hoplophyllum is Eremothamnus, another native of southern Africa. In one classification, published in 2009, these two formed the tribe Eremothamneae. Other authors have placed them in the tribe Arctotideae.

References

External links 
 Hoplophyllum At:Index Nominum Genericorum At: References At: NMNH Department of Botany At: Research and Collections At: Smithsonian National Museum of Natural History
 CRC World Dictionary of Plant Names: D-L At: Botany & Plant Science At: Life Science At: CRC Press
 Hoplophyllum At: IPNI
 Hoplophyllum In: Prodr. (DC.) vol. 5
 Supplementum Plantarum At: botanicus

Asteraceae genera